Archive Cardiacs (also known simply as Archive) is a compilation album by English rock band Cardiacs. The album is composed of early tracks by the band recorded from 1977 to 1979. The tracks were compiled from Cardiacs' demo albums The Obvious Identity (1980) and Toy World (1981), as well as three pieces recorded by Tim Smith and Dominic Luckman for a side project that never saw fruition.

The album was originally released on cassette in 1989 exclusively available to the Cardiacs Yousletter Family and was reissued on CD in 1995.

Track listing 
All songs written by Tim Smith unless otherwise indicated.

Tracks marked with * are demo tracks created by Tim Smith and Dominic Luckman for a side project that never saw fruition.

Personnel
Adapted from the Archive Cardiacs liner notes.
Tim Quy – bass guitar, percussion
Jim Smith – bass guitar, vocals
Sarah Smith – saxophones, clarinets, keyboards, recorders
Tim Smith – guitar, drums, vocals, flutes, keyboards, percussion
Mark Cawthra – drums, keyboards, vocals
Michael Pugh – vocals
Colvin Mayers – keyboards
Dominic Luckman – drums

Technical
Miss Swift – production
The Consultant – production

Chart performance 
The 2021 streaming re-release reached number 73 on the New Zealand iTunes Chart.

References

Cardiacs compilation albums
1989 compilation albums